Jamal Al-Abdullah Sulaiman Sultan (born 1963) is a Qatari sprinter. He competed in the men's 200 metres at the 1984 Summer Olympics.

References

External links

1963 births
Living people
Athletes (track and field) at the 1984 Summer Olympics
Qatari male sprinters
Olympic athletes of Qatar
Place of birth missing (living people)